Francis Theodore Frost (December 21, 1843 – August 25, 1916) was a Canadian manufacturer and politician.

Born in Smiths Falls, Canada West, the son of Ebenezer Frost and Caroline Harwood, he was educated in Smiths Falls, Coventry, Vermont and Potsdam, New York. Frost manufactured farm implements in Smith Falls. He was reeve of Smiths Falls from 1876 to 1883 and became the town's first mayor in 1883. Frost also served as warden for Lanark County. In 1868, he married Maria E. Powell.

Frost was defeated three times (in the 1878, 1882, and 1891 elections) before being elected to the House of Commons of Canada in the 1896 federal election in the Ontario riding of Leeds North and Grenville North. A Liberal, he was defeated in the 1900 federal election.

In 1903, he was appointed Director of Imperial Guarantee and Accident Insurance Company of Canada, and was also appointed to the Senate of Canada to represent the senatorial division of Leeds and Grenville, Ontario.

He died in office in 1916.

References

1843 births
1916 deaths
Canadian senators from Ontario
Liberal Party of Canada MPs
Liberal Party of Canada senators
Members of the House of Commons of Canada from Ontario
Mayors of places in Ontario
Canadian expatriates in the United States
People from Smiths Falls